Jeremy Kaplan is a technology journalist and Content Director with Future plc, publisher of TechRadar. He spent nearly 7 years as Editor-in-Chief of Digital Trends. He has spent over two decades writing about technology in magazines and on websites, with nearly five years as the technology editor for FoxNews.com and over a decade at Ziff Davis Media, publisher of PCMag.com and Extreme Tech.

Education
In 1996, Kaplan received a bachelor of arts from Vassar College with majors in English and Psychology.

Career

Ziff Davis
After a stint on technical journals for programmers, Kaplan joined Ziff Davis Media and PC Magazine in 1998 as a copy editor, remaining with the company in various roles through 2009. In July 2004, he launched ExtremeTech Magazine, a spin-off of the popular website, which focused on deep technology. The magazine targeted newsstands and aimed for a 150,000-issue print run. ExtremeTech Magazine was first published in fall 2004 (Volume 1, Issue 1), and 5 issues were printed, but it was ultimately unsuccessful. Kaplan was promoted to Executive Editor in December 2005, and helped found the GoodCleanTech.com blog in 2007, which was nominated for several awards: It was a finalist in the 2008 MIN Best of the Web Awards and the 2008 Jesse H. Neal National Business Journalism Awards Competition, and was a Weblog award nominee.

The ExtremeTech.com site warned that it would cease updating daily on June 26, 2009, due to most of its core staff members being laid off. In a note posted to the site, then editor Loyd Case wrote "ExtremeTech is changing. The current staff: writers Jason Cross and Joel Durham, producers Jeremy Atkinson and Mike Nguyen, our enthusiastic forum moderator, Jim Lynch, plus your truly, will be leaving Ziff-Davis at the end of this week. Executive Editor Jeremy Kaplan (former editor of ExtremeTech Magazine) will take over management and editorial direction for the site." Kaplan left Ziff Davis shortly thereafter; ExtremeTech relaunched two years later.

Fox News
In 2009 Kaplan joined FoxNews.com as science and technology editor. While there, he helped create a series of articles exposing Hector Xavier Monsegur as the head of LulzSec, revealing his months-long collaboration with the FBI, and detailing the ultimate takedown by law enforcement officials of the hacker collective. The articles were written by Jana Winter, who later made headlines for reporting that Aurora shooter James Holmes had sent a notebook to his psychiatrist with details about his premeditated plan to kill people in a Colorado movie theater.

Digital Trends
Kaplan joined Digital Trends on April Fools' Day in 2014, describing the position as a dream job: "As far back as I can remember, I always wanted to be a gangster. That’s how Goodfellas begins. But me? Ever since way back when, I always wanted to be involved in technology."

In late 2017, he wrote a series of articles exploring the changing retail strategy at Monster Cable and exclusively revealed plans by Lee and Monster to enter online gambling. The casino deal, later confirmed by the SF Chronicle, connects Monster to the Iowa Tribe of Oklahoma and was signed June 20, 2017, bringing controversial figure Fred Kahlilian to the company as the new COO. The gambling site PokerTribe.com will launch on or before December 15, 2017, Khalilian said.

Future plc
On May 24, 2021, Kaplan announced on Twitter that he had left Digital Trends for Future plc, publisher of rival tech site TechRadar. Kaplan described his role as "Content Director for Prosumer Brands."

References 

Living people
American bloggers
American technology journalists
Vassar College alumni
21st-century American non-fiction writers
Year of birth missing (living people)